Bačko Dobro Polje is a village in Serbia, in the Autonomous Province of Vojvodina. It is located in the South Bačka District. Administratively it belongs to the municipality of Vrbas. The village has a Serb ethnic majority and its population numbering 3,929 people (2002 census). It was mostly constructed by settlers from Montenegro in the early 1950s.

Ethnic groups

1971
According to the 1971 census, ethnic Montenegrins comprised 55.39% of population of the village.

2002
In 2002 census, 2,246 (57.17%) inhabitants of the village declared themselves as Serbs and 1,500 (38.18%) as Montenegrins.

Historical population

1961: 3,922
1971: 3,622
1981: 3,768
1991: 3,940

Sport
Sutjeska is a football club in Bačko Dobro Polje. 

According to their Montenegrin roots, they named the football club after the football club from the Montenegrin town of Nikšić. "FK Sutjeska" is a member of "Druga Vojvođanska liga Zapad" (Second Vojvodinian League West) and is currently occupying a low position in the league. However, it had some decent moments in the past and played important role in the Serbian football scene.

See also
List of places in Serbia
List of cities, towns and villages in Vojvodina

References
Republika Srbija, Republički zavod za statistiku, Popis stanovništva, domaćinstava i stanova u 2002., Stanovništvo - nacionalna ili etnička pripadnost, podaci po naseljima 1, Beograd (February 2003).
Dr Branislav Bukurov, Bačka, Banat i Srem, Novi Sad (1978).
Slobodan Ćurčić, Broj stanovnika Vojvodine, Novi Sad, 1996.

Places in Bačka
South Bačka District